The women's 4 x 100 metres relay at the 2009 World Championships in Athletics was held at the Olympic Stadium on August 21 and August 22.

Medalists

Records
Prior to the competition, the following records were as follows.

No new world or championship record was set during this competition.

Qualification standard

Schedule

Results

Heats
The first 2 of each heat (Q) plus the 2 fastest times (q) qualify.

Key:  DNF = Did not finish, DNS = Did not start, NR = National record, Q = qualification by place in heat, q = qualification by overall place, SB = Seasonal best

Final

Key:  SB = Seasonal best

4x100
Relays at the World Athletics Championships
4 × 100 metres relay
2009 in women's athletics